Felipe "Lopes" Guimarães (born March 22, 1991, in Anápolis, Goiás) is a Brazilian racing driver.

After a childhood in karting, Guimarães transitioned to the extremely competitive Formula Three Sudamericana series at the age of 16 and finished 4th in points with two victories. 2008 took him to Europe where he competed in Euroseries 3000 where he finished 9th in points. He then competed in 11 rounds of the 2008-09 A1 Grand Prix season for A1 Team Brazil where his best finish was second place in the feature race at Kyalami.  He signed on with Bryan Herta Autosport to make his Firestone Indy Lights debut at Watkins Glen International in July 2009. He finished on the podium in 3rd place in his first Indy Lights start. He made two more Indy Lights starts and finished in second at Infineon Raceway.

Racing record

Career summary

Complete A1 Grand Prix results
(key) (Races in bold indicate pole position) (Races in italics indicate fastest lap)

American open–wheel racing results
(key)

Indy Lights Series

Complete GP3 Series results
(key) (Races in bold indicate pole position) (Races in italics indicate fastest lap)

Complete FIA European Formula 3 Championship results
(key)

Complete Stock Car Brasil results
(key) (Races in bold indicate pole position) (Races in italics indicate fastest lap)

References

External links

1991 births
Living people
Sportspeople from Goiás
Brazilian racing drivers
A1 Team Brazil drivers
Formula 3 Sudamericana drivers
Auto GP drivers
Indy Lights drivers
Brazilian GP3 Series drivers
British Formula Three Championship drivers
FIA Formula 3 European Championship drivers
A1 Grand Prix drivers
Bryan Herta Autosport drivers
Hitech Grand Prix drivers
Fortec Motorsport drivers
Double R Racing drivers
Super Nova Racing drivers